In fiction, a plot hole, plothole or plot error is a gap or inconsistency in a storyline that goes against the flow of logic established by the story's plot. 

Plot holes are usually created unintentionally, often as a result of editing or the writers simply forgetting that a new event would contradict previous events.

Types
Types of plot hole include:

Factual errors Historical anachronisms, or incorrect statements about the world.
Impossible events Something that defies the laws of science, as established for the story's setting.
Out-of-character behavior A character acting in a way that, based on their understanding of the options available to them, they would not realistically choose.
Continuity errors Events in the story which contradict those established earlier.
Unresolved storylines One of the plot lines is not resolved by the end of the story, or a character who is expected to reappear does not.

Examples
 Agatha Christie's seminal mystery play The Mousetrap is known for its large number of plot holes. One of them is that the detective, despite knowing the identity of the murderer, lets him proceed to kill further people, rather than arresting them on the spot. This is considered a plot hole because there is no reason for the audience to believe that the detective would want more murders to take place.
 At the end of the Star Wars film Revenge of the Sith, it is considered imperative to hide Luke Skywalker from Darth Vader, but Obi-Wan Kenobi does so in plain sight on Vader's home planet, even using Luke's real name. He himself only slightly alters his name and makes no secret of his Jedi heritage.
 At the end of the Lord of the Rings story The Return of the King, after destroying the One Ring, Frodo Baggins and Samwise Gamgee are rescued from Mordor and taken to safety by the giant eagles. Some readers regard this as a plot hole, arguing that the eagles could have flown the Ring there without being corrupted by the Ring or seen by Sauron's all-seeing eye, obviating the need for Frodo to go in the first place.

See also
Plot (narrative)
Idiot plot
Continuity (fiction)
Deus ex machina
Retroactive continuity

References

External links
Screenrant's 16 Movie Plot Holes That Aren’t Actually Plot Holes
Star Wars Fan Debunks Huff Post's "40 Unforgivable Plot Holes in The Force Awakens"
Ten Debunked Movie Plot Holes

Continuity errors
Fiction
Plot (narrative)